The Thomas Slye House is a historic residence located north of Andrew, Iowa, United States.  It is one of over 217 limestone structures in Jackson County from the mid-19th century, of which 101 are houses.  The Slye house features a five bay symmetrical facade capped by a gable roof.  Slye, a native of England, quarried the stones for the house himself and had a stonemason construct the house.  The stones are of various sizes and shapes and laid in courses.  The double end chimneys are found on only two other stone houses in the county, and the Slye and DeFries houses have them constructed in brick.  Also similar to the DeFries House is the use of jack arches instead on lintels above the windows and doors.  It is possible that both houses were constructed by the same stonemason.  A single-story frame addition with an attached two-car garage was built onto the back of the houses at a later date.  The house was listed on the National Register of Historic Places in 1992.

References

Houses completed in 1860
Vernacular architecture in Iowa
Houses in Jackson County, Iowa
National Register of Historic Places in Jackson County, Iowa
Houses on the National Register of Historic Places in Iowa